Paul Jason McCarthy (4 August 1971 – 19 February 2017) was an Irish footballer who last played for Ebbsfleet United as a defender. He made over 500 appearances in the Football League and Football Conference, notably for Brighton & Hove Albion, Wycombe Wanderers and Ebbsfleet United.

Career
Born in Cork, County Cork, McCarthy began his career as a trainee with Brighton & Hove Albion, where he made over 200 league and cup appearances before joining Wycombe Wanderers for a fee of £100,000 in July 1996. He made over 250 appearances for Wycombe in seven seasons at the club, helping the club to a FA Cup semi-final against Liverpool in April 2001. He scored Wycombe's first goal in their quarter-final win over Premier League side Leicester City, paving the way for Roy Essandoh to score the winner. McCarthy joined Oxford United on loan in March 2003, joining the club on a permanent basis at the end of the season.

After 35 appearances for Oxford, he was released on a free transfer in summer 2004 and joined non-League club Hornchurch. He became available after Hornchurch ran into financial trouble and signed for Conference National club Gravesend & Northfleet (now Ebbsfleet United) in November 2004. He became club captain and by the end of the 2007–08 season, had made over 110 appearances for Ebbsfleet and collected a winners medal when Ebbsfleet won the FA Trophy in May 2008. He signed a new one-year contract with Ebbsfleet in June 2008 and a year later he was appointed as player–assistant manager at the club. Paul left Ebbsfleet in July 2013 following a change of owner at the club. He subsequently signed with Crowborough AFC on 4 August 2013.

McCarthy died suddenly on 19 February 2017, aged 45, of a suspected heart attack.

International career 
He played and scored for the Republic of Ireland national football team at the 1991 FIFA World Youth Championship.

Honours
FA Trophy: 2008

References

External links

1971 births
2017 deaths
Association footballers from Cork (city)
Republic of Ireland association footballers
Republic of Ireland under-21 international footballers
Association football defenders
Brighton & Hove Albion F.C. players
Wycombe Wanderers F.C. players
Oxford United F.C. players
Hornchurch F.C. players
Ebbsfleet United F.C. players
English Football League players
National League (English football) players